Mandell is a surname and a given name:

Notable people with the surname include:

Arnold J. Mandell, American neuroscientist and psychiatrist
Barbara Mandell (1920–1998), British television journalist and travel writer
Daniel Mandell (1895–1987), American film editor
Eleni Mandell (born 1969), American singer-songwriter
Koby Mandell, Israeli-American child, killed in 2001 by Palestinian terrorists
Richard Mandell (born 1968), American golf course architect
Robert Mandell, American animated series and film director and producer
Robert Mandell (conductor) (born 1929), American conductor
Sammy Mandell (born 1904), boxer
Sherri Mandell, Israeli author and activist
Steve Mandell (–2018), American bluegrass guitarist and banjoist

Notable people with the given name include:

Edward Mandell House (1858–1938), American diplomat, politician, and presidential advisor
Mandell Berman (born 1917), businessman and philanthropist
Mandell Creighton (1843–1901), English historian and a prelate of the Church of England
Mandell Maughan, American actress

See also
Mandel
Mantell (disambiguation)
Mendel (disambiguation)
Mindell
Mundell